Raivavae (Tahitian: Ra‘ivāvae /ra.ʔi.va:va.e/) is one of the Austral Islands in French Polynesia. At the 2017 census, it had a population of 903. The island is of volcanic origin, and rises to  elevation at Mont Hiro.

History
The first sighting by Europeans was recorded by the Spanish naval officer Tomás Gayangos on board of the frigate El Aguila on 5 February 1775. Gayangos had taken over the command of the expedition of Domingo de Bonechea of 1774 after his death in Tahiti and was returning to the Viceroyalty of Peru. The main source describing this sighting is that of José Andía y Varela, pilot of the packet boat Jupiter that accompanied El Aguila in this return trip. On 6 February,  a boat was sent in, and made contact with the inhabitants at the shore edge, but landing was not made. Raivavae was charted as Santa Rosa by the Spaniards, who recorded as Oraibaba the name of the island said by the inhabitants.

It was annexed by France in 1880.

Administration
The islands of Raivavae are administratively within the commune with the same name. Raivavae consists of the following associated communes:
 Anatonu
 Rairua-Mahanatoa
 Vaiuru

See also 
Islands controlled by France in the Indian and Pacific oceans

References

Islands of the Austral Islands
Communes of French Polynesia